Amped may refer to:

Amped video games series:
Amped: Freestyle Snowboarding
Amped 2
Amped 3
Amped (116 Clique EP)
Amped (Seven Witches album), 2005
Amped (Those Darn Accordions EP), 2002
Amped (novel), 2012
A.M.P.E.D., a 2007 American television series

See also

 Amp (disambiguation)
 AMPS (disambiguation)
 Ampere (disambiguation)